Paris Holiday is a 2015 Chinese-Hong Kong romantic comedy film directed by James Yuen (阮世生). The film was released in Hong Kong on July 23 and in China on July 31, 2015.

Plot
Two broken-hearted person met as roommate and they learn to let go of the past and set out to find their soulmate in the beautiful romantic city, Paris.

Cast
Louis Koo
Amber Kuo
Jeremy Tsui
Candy Liu
Alex Fong
Jing Hu
Janice Man
Anthony Chan
Simon Lui
Michelle Wai
Carl Ng
Carlos Chan

Reception
The film earned  at the Chinese box office.

References

2015 romantic comedy films
Chinese romantic comedy films
2010s English-language films
Hong Kong romantic comedy films
2010s Mandarin-language films
Heyi Pictures films
Films directed by James Yuen
2010s Hong Kong films